In the 1951–52 season, USM Alger is competing in the Second Division for the 15th season French colonial era, as well as the Forconi Cup. They competing in First Division, and the Forconi Cup.

Squad list
Players and squad numbers last updated on 30 September 1951.Note: Flags indicate national team as has been defined under FIFA eligibility rules. Players may hold more than one non-FIFA nationality.

Pre-season and friendlies

Competitions

Overview

First Division

League table

Group I

 Results of Playoffs First Division

Matches

Playoffs

Forconi Cup

Squad information

Playing statistics

Goalscorers
Includes all competitive matches. The list is sorted alphabetically by surname when total goals are equal.

References

External links
 L'Echo d'Alger : journal républicain du matin
 La Dépêche quotidienne : journal républicain du matin

USM Alger seasons
Algerian football clubs 1951–52 season